The Amsterdam Stakes is a Grade II American Thoroughbred horse race for three-year-old horses over the distance of  furlongs on the dirt, scheduled annually in August at Saratoga Race Course in Saratoga Springs, New York.  The event currently carries a purse of $200,000.

History

The event was inaugurated at Belmont Park on 17 July 1993 as the Screen King Stakes and was run over a distance of seven furlongs and the winner Evil Bear was ridden by United States' Racing Hall of Fame jockey José A. Santos in a time of 1:22.09. The event honored Screen King who had won his first four races  including the Grade III Swift Stakes at Aqueduct Racetrack.

The following year the event moved to Saratoga and the distance was decreased to six furlongs and split into two divisions.

In 1998 the event was renamed for Amsterdam, New York, a town about 26 miles from Saratoga Springs in Upstate New York. That same year the race was upgraded to a Grade III and was run in split divisions. In 2001 the event was upgraded to Grade II.

Of the notable winners of this event are 1996 winner Distorted Humor who much later on in 2011 became Leading sire in North America and in 2017 the Leading broodmare sire in North America. In 2009 Quality Road resumed after injury after winning the Grade I Florida Derby missing all three legs of the U.S. Triple Crown series and winning the event in track record time of 1:13.74 breaking Saratoga's 30-year track record.

An earlier edition of the Amsterdam Stakes was run at Saratoga from 1901 through at least 1915 that was open to horses age three and older.

Records
Speed record:  
 furlongs:  1:13.74 – Quality Road (2009) 
6 furlongs:  1:08.50 – Yaupon (2020)

Margins:
 lengths – Shancelot (2019)

Most wins by an owner:
 2 – Lewis G. Lakin (In partnership) (2001, 2002)

Most wins by a jockey:
 4 – Pat Day (1995, 1996, 2000, 2002)
 4 - Joel Rosario (2013, 2016, 2020, 2021)

Most wins by a trainer:
 6 - Steven M. Asmussen (2004, 2005, 2015, 2020, 2021, 2022)

Winners

See also
List of American and Canadian Graded races

References

Graded stakes races in the United States
Grade 2 stakes races in the United States
Open sprint category horse races
Saratoga Race Course
Horse races in New York (state)
1993 establishments in New York (state)
Recurring sporting events established in 1993